The Bonin House is a historic house in St. Martinville, Louisiana, U.S.. It was built in 1850, and designed in the Greek Revival architectural style. It was redesigned in the Italianate style in 1875, and in the Colonial Revival style in 1910. It belonged to Luke Bonin and his wife, Blanche, from 1904 to 1964, and to their grandson, Willie Z. Bienvenu, from 1969 to 1996. It has been listed on the National Register of Historic Places since January 27, 1997.

References

National Register of Historic Places in St. Martin Parish, Louisiana
Italianate architecture in Louisiana
Queen Anne architecture in Louisiana
Colonial Revival architecture in Louisiana
Houses completed in 1850
1850 establishments in Louisiana